The 1948–49 AHL season was the 13th season of the American Hockey League. Eleven teams played 68 games each in the schedule. The Wally Kilrea Trophy for the league's "top point scorer," is renamed the Carl Liscombe Trophy. The St. Louis Flyers won their first F. G. "Teddy" Oke Trophy as West Division champions. The Providence Reds and won their third Calder Cup as league champions.

Final standings
Note: GP = Games played; W = Wins; L = Losses; T = Ties; GF = Goals for; GA = Goals against; Pts = Points;

Scoring leaders

Note: GP = Games played; G = Goals; A = Assists; Pts = Points; PIM = Penalty minutes

 complete list

Calder Cup playoffs

Trophy and award winners
Team awards

Individual awards

See also
List of AHL seasons

References
AHL official site
AHL Hall of Fame
HockeyDB

American Hockey League seasons
2